HUDF-JD2 (UDF 033238.7 -274839.8 or BBG 3179) is a distant, massive, post-starburst galaxy
that was discovered with the Hubble Ultra Deep Field (HUDF) image. It was the most distant galaxy identified in the HUDF, in 2005.

In a 2005 search for very red galaxies in the HUDF that were not detected at wavelengths shorter than the near-infrared J band, two objects were detected. The second, initially designated UDF033238.7-274839.8, displayed a high redshift and showed characteristics of a post-starburst galaxy. The derived photometric redshift yielded z approximately equal to 6.5, which indicates it is most likely being viewed from a time when the Universe was only 830 million years old.

The spectrum of this object indicates that most of its energy is being emitted by stars with three solar masses or less. Hence, as larger stars will exist for shorter periods, this galaxy has an age of more than 300 million years. The period of initial active star formation in this galaxy may have lasted less than 100 million years, during which the galaxy likely participated in the reionization event.

The unusually high mass estimate for this object may be explained by other factors. If it has an active galactic nucleus, this may reduce the mass estimate to half the current value. The estimate could also be effected by gravitational lensing, although it is too far away from the nearest visible object that could produce that effect: a foreground spiral galaxy located 7.3 distant.

See also
List of the most distant astronomical objects

References

External links
 
Hubblesite HUDF.JD2

Starburst galaxies
Fornax (constellation)
Hubble Ultra-Deep Field
Hubble Space Telescope